Carole Shorenstein Hays (born September 15, 1948 as Carole J. Shorenstein) is an American theatrical producer.

Biography
Shorenstein was one of three children born to real estate developer Walter Shorenstein and Phyllis Finley. Her father was born Jewish and her mother converted to Judaism. She had two siblings: CBS producer Joan Shorenstein (who died of cancer in 1985) and real estate investor Douglas W. Shorenstein (who died of cancer in 2015), the former chairman of the board of directors of the Federal Reserve Bank of San Francisco (his term ran from 2011 to 2014). She lives in Sea Cliff, San Francisco, California with her husband Jeff Hays. They have two children, Wally and Gracie. She was appointed to the National Park Foundation Board of Directors in 2009.

She is the owner of The Curran Theatre in San Francisco.

Career 
Shorenstein attended New York University but did not graduate. She worked at United Artists as a movie publicist for the film Live and Let Die.  Later she joined her father's long time friend, James M. Nederlander as a business partner and established herself as a respected producer of critically acclaimed and financially successful works.  She owns the Curran Theatre and served as President of SHN, a theatrical producing company in San Francisco. Several of the plays she produced have received Tony Awards, including a revival of Fences in 2010 .

She has produced many award-winning Broadway plays. In addition to her Broadway endeavors, she was the President of SHN (Theatres), a theatrical producing company in San Francisco. She gave up her stake in SHN in 2019 and the company changed its name to BroadwaySF. She is the only Broadway producer to win the Tony Awards as producer for two different productions of the same play—August Wilson's Pulitzer Prize–winning Fences, winning Best Play for the original production in 1987 starring James Earl Jones, and Best Revival for the 2010 run starring Denzel Washington. She served as lead producer of the Broadway production of John Patrick Shanley's Doubt, which won the 2005 Tony Award for Best Play and The Pulitzer Prize. Carole also co-produced the Broadway production of Julius Caesar starring Denzel Washington. She has produced these additional Tony Award-winning plays on Broadway: Richard Greenberg's Take Me Out, Edward Albee's The Goat, or Who Is Sylvia, and Pulitzer Prize winner Proof by David Auburn. Other Broadway productions include Tony Kushner's Caroline, or Change, Suzan-Lori Parks's 2002 Pulitzer Prize-winning Topdog/Underdog, Charles Busch's The Tale of the Allergist's Wife, Patrick Marber's Closer, David Mamet's The Old Neighborhood, the Royal Court/Théâtre de Complicité production of Eugène Ionesco's The Chairs, and the RSC production of A Midsummer Night's Dream.

Productions

References

External links
 

1948 births
Living people
Businesspeople from San Francisco
20th-century American Jews
American theatre managers and producers
Shorenstein family
21st-century American Jews